William Nelson Kelly (born December 2, 1939) is an American politician. He served as a Democratic-Farmer-Labor member for the 2A and 66B district of the Minnesota House of Representatives.

Life and career 
Kelly was born in East Grand Forks, Minnesota. He attended the University of North Dakota. Kelly was a teacher at East Grand Forks Senior High School. He served in the Peace Corps from 1965 to 1967.

In 1971, Kelly was elected to represent the 66B district of the Minnesota House of Representatives, serving until 1972. The next year, Kelly was elected to represent the 2A district, serving until 1978.

References 

1939 births
Living people
People from East Grand Forks, Minnesota
Democratic Party members of the Minnesota House of Representatives
20th-century American politicians
University of North Dakota alumni